Common as Light and Love Are Red Valleys of Blood is the eighth studio album by the American indie folk act Sun Kil Moon, self-produced by primary recording artist Mark Kozelek. The album was released on 17 February 2017 on Caldo Verde Records. It is a double album and comprises 16 tracks in total, being Sun Kil Moon's longest album to date.

Reception

Upon its release, Common as Light and Love Are Red Valleys of Blood received positive reviews from music critics. At Metacritic, which assigns a normalized rating out of 100 to reviews from critics, the album currently holds an average score of 65, indicating "generally favorable reviews".

In a positive review for Chorus.fm, Aaron Mook writes, "Common as Light and Love is strange and flawed and beautiful all at once, sometimes all within the span of one eight-minute song," concluding, "regardless of general spottiness, Kozelek is still capable of creating moments of true beauty and unique insight."

Track listing

Personnel
 Mark Kozelek – composer, instrumentation, photography, producer 
 Steve Shelley – drums, percussion
 Nick Zubeck – bass guitar, composer, keyboards
 Forrest Day – saxophone
 Will Chason – recording, mixing
 Nathan Winter – engineer, mixing
 Brian Azer – design

Charts

References

External links
 

2017 albums
Sun Kil Moon albums
Caldo Verde Records albums